Valeri Lobanovsky Memorial Tournament is an international football tournament established in honour and memory of Valeri Lobanovsky since his death on 13 May 2002, hence the name Memorial. The idea was initiated by the FC Dynamo Kyiv management and the tournament is played at the Valeriy Lobanovskyi Dynamo Stadium in Kyiv, Ukraine.

General rules
Since 2005, the tournament participants are a group of four selected national teams. From 2006 the tournament participants have been the Under-21 National Teams. The teams start-off in semifinals and the winners go on to play in the final; the other two teams play for the 3rd place. 

In 2009 two games of the tournament were played at Boreks Stadium, Borodianka in Kyiv Oblast.

In 2011 two games of the U-21 international tournament were played at Obolon Arena.

In 2012 two games of the tournament were played at Bannikov Stadium.

Champions and top goalscorers

Performance among national teams
Legend
1st – Champions
2nd – Runners-up
3rd – Third place
4th – Fourth place

Stadiums
 Valeriy Lobanovskyi Dynamo Stadium – 12 (2005, 2006, 2007, 2009, 2010, 2011, 2012, 2013, 2015, 2016, 2017, 2018)
 Bannikov Stadium – 10 (2006, 2007, 2008, 2010, 2012, 2013, 2015, 2016, 2019, 2021)
 Obolon Arena – 4 (2011, 2013, 2016, 2021)
 Systema Stadium (Borodyanka) – 2 (2009, 2010)
 Kolos Stadium (Boryspil) – 2 (2017, 2018)
 Olimpiyskiy National Sports Complex – 1 (2019)

Notes and references

Notes

References

External links
 Lobanovsky International Tournament at Rec.Sport.Soccer Statistics Foundation.

International association football competitions hosted by Ukraine
Recurring sporting events established in 2003
2003 establishments in Ukraine
Youth association football competitions for international teams
Ukrainian football friendly trophies
Youth football in Ukraine
Defunct international club association football competitions in Europe